Oleg Vladimirovich Sobirov (born 13 March 1981) is an Uzbekistani professional footballer who plays for FC Tobol.

External links 

 
 Profile at klisf.info

1981 births
Living people
Soviet footballers
Uzbekistani footballers
Uzbekistan international footballers
Uzbekistani expatriate footballers
Kazakhstan Premier League players
FC Aktobe players
FC Karpaty Lviv players
Navbahor Namangan players
FC Tobol players
Expatriate footballers in Ukraine
Uzbekistani expatriate sportspeople in Ukraine
Association football defenders